The 1954 Tangerine Bowl was an American college football bowl game played after the 1953 season, on January 1, 1954, at the Tangerine Bowl stadium in Orlando, Florida.  The Arkansas State Indians (now the Arkansas State Red Wolves) tied the East Texas State Lions (now the Texas A&M–Commerce Lions) by a score of 7–7.

Game summary
The first quarter saw the first score of the game, as Bobby Spann found James Turley on a 20-yard pass for an Arkansas State touchdown. That proved to be the only scoring of the quarter, which finished 7–0. The second quarter and third quarter were scoreless. The scoring drought was ended in the fourth quarter by East Texas State's Billy Ray Norris, on a 1-yard rush. The extra point tied the game at 7–7, and neither team managed to score again.

Aftermath
The tie ended a streak of 29 consecutive victories by East Texas State. Arkansas State quarterback Bobby Spann was selected as MVP of the game.

This game was the second tie in Tangerine Bowl history (the first having been the 1949 game), and the third-lowest scoring behind the 1948 game between Catawba and Marshall (finished 7–0) and the 1950 game between Emory & Henry and St. Vincent (finished 7–6). The game's third-place position was soon overtaken, though, as Omaha and Eastern Kentucky finished 7–6 the next year and Juniata and Missouri Valley tied 6–6 the year after that, which put the 1954 edition at the fifth-lowest scoring Tangerine Bowl, a position it maintains to present day (throughout all name-changes and variations of the bowl).

Scoring summary

Statistics

References

Tangerine Bowl
Citrus Bowl (game)
Arkansas State Red Wolves football bowl games
Texas A&M–Commerce Lions football bowl games
Tangerine Bowl
Tangerine Bowl